José Raúl Contreras Arrau (born March 23, 1982) is a Chilean former footballer.

He played as a defender for Universidad de Chile. He got his chance to debut with the adult squad in 2003. He has represented his country at the Sub-23 level.

In January 2008, sixty-percent of Contreras ownership was sold to Universidad de Chile for $150,000.

Honours

Club
Universidad de Chile
 Primera División de Chile (1): 2009 Apertura

Huachipato
 Primera División de Chile (1): 2012 Clausura

External links
 
 
 BDFA profile 

1982 births
Living people
Chilean footballers
People from Quilpué
Chile international footballers
Santiago Wanderers footballers
C.D. Huachipato footballers
Universidad de Chile footballers
Audax Italiano footballers
Association football fullbacks